Cyrtaspis is a genus of bush crickets belonging to the tribe Meconematini within the subfamily Meconematinae. They are found in mainland Western Europe (not the British Isles) and North Africa.

Species
The Orthoptera Species File lists the following species:
Cyrtaspis scutata (Charpentier, 1825) – type species (as Barbitistes scutatus Charpentier, 1825, locality: Portugal)
Cyrtaspis tuberculata Barranco, 2006

References

External links

Meconematinae
Tettigoniidae genera
Orthoptera of Europe